Music from and Inspired by Showgirls is the soundtrack album of the 1995 film Showgirls. The album features tracks only recorded for the Paul Verhoeven film, including an early version of David Bowie's "I'm Afraid of Americans", and a song of Siouxsie and the Banshees' "New Skin" recorded near Prague in June 1995. The soundtrack also includes songs specifically recorded for the film by Killing Joke and Scylla (a then new band featuring Curve's singer Toni Halliday).

The Young Gods' song, "Kissing the Sun", only appeared on the US edition of the soundtrack and did not feature on the European and Japanese releases.

Track listing

References

1995 compilation albums
1995 soundtrack albums
Rock soundtracks
Rock compilation albums
Pop soundtracks
Pop compilation albums
Industrial compilation albums
Industrial soundtracks
Drama film soundtracks